Hoelsand or Holssanden is a village in Sunndal Municipality in Møre og Romsdal county, Norway. The village is located along the river Driva, just west of the Vinnufossen waterfall.

See also
Other neighboring villages in Sunndal municipality: Gjøra, Grøa, Jordalsgrenda, Romfo, Ålvund, Ålvundeidet, and Øksendalsøra.

References

Sunndal
Villages in Møre og Romsdal